Solodikhino is the name of several rural localities in Russia.

Modern localities
Solodikhino, Puchezhsky District, Ivanovo Oblast, a village in Puchezhsky District of Ivanovo Oblast
Solodikhino, Verkhnelandekhovsky District, Ivanovo Oblast, a village in Verkhnelandekhovsky District of Ivanovo Oblast

Abolished localities
Solodikhino, Kostroma Oblast, a village in Zadorinsky Selsoviet of Parfenyevsky District in Kostroma Oblast; abolished on October 18, 2004

References

Notes

Sources